The Government of Puntland is the supreme governing authority of the Autonomous region  of Puntland State of Somalia. The legal structure of Puntland consists of the judiciary, legislative (House of Representatives) and the executive (the President and his nominated council of Ministries) branches of government. Puntland has conducted four presidential elections (1998, 2004, 2009, 2014). Presidents are elected by a 66-member unicameral parliament. Since 1998, the governing bodies have been located in the regional capital of Garowe.

Establishment
Following the outbreak of the civil war in 1991, a homegrown constitutional conference was held in Garowe in 1998 over a period of three months. Attended by the area's political elite, traditional elders (Issims), members of the business community, intellectuals and other civil society representatives, the autonomous Puntland State of Somalia was subsequently officially established so as to deliver services to the population, offer security, facilitate trade, and interact with both domestic and international partners.

Government agencies
 Puntland Agency for Social Welfare (PASWE)
 Puntland Highway Authority (PHA)
 Puntland State Agency for Water, Energy and Natural Resources (PSAWEN)
 Puntland Petroleum and Mineral Agency (PPMA)

Cabinet

References

External links
 Official Government Website

Puntland
Politics of Somalia
Political organisations based in Somalia
Government agencies established in 1998